Geneviève Hébert (born 1973) is a Canadian politician, who was elected to the National Assembly of Quebec in the 2018 provincial election. She represents the electoral district of Saint-François as a member of the Coalition Avenir Québec.

References

1973 births
Living people
Coalition Avenir Québec MNAs
Politicians from Sherbrooke
Women MNAs in Quebec
21st-century Canadian politicians
21st-century Canadian women politicians